Man, Myth & Magic: An Illustrated Encyclopedia of the Supernatural is an encyclopedia of the supernatural, including magic, mythology and religion. It was edited by Richard Cavendish. The art director was Brian Innes, former percussionist of surrealistic 1960s band The Temperance Seven.

Man, Myth & Magic was originally published by BPC Publishing, Ltd. as a partwork, a limited British weekly magazine intended to be collected as a whole. The printer was Purnell & Sons, Leeds. Publication commenced in 1970, and continued for 112 issues spanning 1,000 articles with some 5,000 illustrations, many of them in full colour. Purnell also sold binders for gathering the installments into seven volumes, plus one additional binder for the magazine covers.

In 1970 BPC Publishing Ltd put out a very popular hardcover set condensing all 112 magazines into a 24 volume set.
It was reprinted as a 21 volume revised edition by Marshall Cavendish in 1995.
The material has been sold to Cavendish Square Publishing, which has published ten volumes of the material reorganized into books according to subject, including Witches and Witchcraft as well as Beliefs, Rituals, and Symbols of Ancient Greece and Rome. Cavendish Square revised the encyclopaedia into a five volume library bound set, in 2014.

More than two hundred academics and specialists contributed to the magazine, and wrote in a generally accessible style.

The editorial board consisted of:

 Glyn Daniel, archaeologist and editor of 'Antiquity'.
 E. R. Dodds, former Regius Professor of Greek at Oxford.
 Mircea Eliade, professor of the History of Religion at University of Chicago.
 William Sargant, past Physician in Charge of the Department of Psychological Medicine, St. Thomas' Hospital.
 John Symonds, author and literary executor of Aleister Crowley.
 R. J. Zwi Werblowsky, professor of Comparative Religion, Dean of Faculty of Humanities, Hebrew University, Jerusalem.
 Robert Charles Zaehner, Spalding Professor of Eastern Religion and Ethics, Oxford.
 Cottie Arthur Burland, formerly of the Department of Ethnography at the British Museum.

References

Encyclopedias of culture and ethnicity
Mythology books
Occult books